John Dickie Elliot Murphy (born 1898) was a Scottish footballer who played as an outside right. His first and longest senior spell was with Heart of Midlothian where he spent the better part of seven seasons (including brief loans at St Mirren and Hamilton Academical), followed by around a year at Motherwell and 18 months at Kilmarnock. He then moved to the Irish leagues with Coleraine and Ballymena United in County Antrim then Dublin side Shelbourne.

Notes and references
 

Scottish footballers
1898 births
Year of death unknown
20th-century deaths
Place of death unknown
People from Govan
Footballers from Glasgow
Scottish people of Irish descent
Scottish Football League players
Scottish Junior Football Association players
NIFL Premiership players
Association football outside forwards
St Anthony's F.C. players
Heart of Midlothian F.C. players
Hamilton Academical F.C. players
St Mirren F.C. players
Motherwell F.C. players
Kilmarnock F.C. players
Coleraine F.C. players
Ballymena United F.C. players
Shelbourne F.C. players
League of Ireland players
Scottish expatriate sportspeople in Ireland
Expatriate association footballers in the Republic of Ireland
Scottish expatriate footballers